In architecture, a transom is a transverse horizontal structural beam or bar, or a crosspiece separating a door from a window above it. This contrasts with a mullion, a vertical structural member. Transom or transom window is also the customary U.S. word used for a transom light, the window over this crosspiece. In Britain, the transom light is usually referred to as a fanlight, often with a semi-circular shape, especially when the window is segmented like the slats of a folding hand fan. A prominent example of this is at the main entrance of 10 Downing Street, the official residence of the British prime minister.

History
In early Gothic ecclesiastical work, transoms are found only in belfry unglazed windows or spire lights, where they were deemed necessary to strengthen the mullions in the absence of the iron stay bars, which in glazed windows served a similar purpose. In the later Gothic, and more especially the Perpendicular Period, the introduction of transoms became common in windows of all kinds.

Function

Transom windows which could be opened to provide cross-ventilation while maintaining security and privacy (due to their small size and height above floor level) were a common feature of apartments, homes, office buildings, schools, and other buildings before central air conditioning and heating became common beginning in the early-to-mid 20th century.

In order to operate opening transom windows, they were generally fitted with transom operators, a sort of wand assembly. In industrial buildings, transom operators could use a variety of mechanical arrangements.

Idiomatic usage
The phrase "over the transom" refers to works submitted for publication without being solicited. The image evoked is of a writer tossing a manuscript through the open window over the door of the publisher's office.

Similarly, the phrase is used to describe the means by which confidential documents, information or tips were delivered anonymously to someone who is not officially supposed to have them.

Some such phrases may refer instead to the transom of a ship - large waves from behind can bring water over the transom.

"Like pushing a piano through a transom" is a folk idiom used to describe something exceedingly difficult; its application to childbirth (and possibly its origin) has been attributed to Alice Roosevelt Longworth and Fannie Brice.

France
In French, transom windows are called  (previously spelled ), from the German , literally “what is that?”.

Japan
Architectural details called  are often found above doors in traditional Japanese buildings.

These details can be anything from simple shōji-style dividers to elaborate wooden carvings, and they serve as a traditional welcome to visitors of the head of the household.

See also

 Roof lantern
 Sidelight
 Skylight
 Fortochka

References 

Architectural elements
Windows